George Clark Phillips Brown (7 January 1907 – 1988) was a Scottish footballer who played for Rangers and the Scotland national team at left half.

Football career
Brown was born in Glasgow on 7 January 1907. He joined Rangers in September 1929 from Ashfield and made his debut against Ayr United in November of that year. He remained at Rangers for the remainder of his career, winning a total of seven League Championships and four Scottish Cups before retiring in 1942.

He was capped 19 times by Scotland, making his debut against Wales in October 1930. He captained Scotland on two occasions. Brown also played in one unofficial wartime international, in February 1941.

After football
After retiring from playing, Brown became a director at Rangers. He was also a school teacher, having graduated from the University of Glasgow, and became headmaster of Bellahouston Academy in Glasgow.

See also
List of Scotland national football team captains
 List of Scotland wartime international footballers

References

External links

1907 births
1988 deaths
Date of death missing
Footballers from Glasgow
Association football wing halves
Scottish Football League players
Scottish footballers
Scotland international footballers
Rangers F.C. players
Alumni of the University of Glasgow
Rangers F.C. non-playing staff
Scottish Football League representative players
Scotland wartime international footballers
Scottish schoolteachers
Ashfield F.C. players
Scottish Junior Football Association players